Beryozovo is a rural locality (a selo) and the administrative center of Beryozovskoye Rural Settlement, Ostrogozhsky District, Voronezh Oblast, Russia. The population was 488 as of 2010. There are 14 streets.

Geography 
Beryozovo is located 24 km northwest of Ostrogozhsk (the district's administrative centre) by road. Ternovoye is the nearest rural locality.

References 

Rural localities in Ostrogozhsky District